Top Model po-ukrainsky formerly known as Supermodel po-ukrainsky (Ukrainian:Супермодель по-українськи) is a Ukrainian reality television series which takes its format from the Spanish reality show Supermodelo. The show places a group of young contestants from Ukraine against each other in a variety of challenges to determine who will win title of the new 'Ukrainian supermodel' along with a lucrative modelling contract, and other prizes in the hope of a successful future in the modeling industry.

Beginning with season 4, the franchise adopted the Top Model format.

Judges
The competition is hosted by supermodel Alla Kostromichova. The panel of the first cycle is composed of host Alla Kostromichova, along with Sergey Nikitiuk, Sonia Plakydiuk, and Richard Gorn.

Cycles

Criticism and controversy 
Season 1

In episode 12, contestants had to pose nude with 3 male models. Contestants Tatyana Bryk and Vlada Pecheritsina were under 18 years old and this fact was heavily criticised. https://www.youtube.com/watch?v=8i6qwni2IN0&list=PLkDczlX91q8OBSxGkPC5DxYi2tTYnYnIf&index=3

Contestant Vlada Pecheritsina was heavily criticised by fandom due to gossip that her lover was a producer on Novyy Channel and gifted her a place in the finale.

Season 2

In episode 2, contestant Sveta Melashych, quit competition after getting bullied by Anya Sulima and Arina Lyubityelyeva.

Season 3

In episode 13, contestant Maria Grebenyuk (who won competition later) returned to the competition. Her return was leaked in the teaser of this episode.

After Maria Grebenyuk was declared as the winner of the season 3, there was a blacklash from fans. They denied her win as, according to their opinion, Daria Maystrenko, who was placed 2nd, should have won competition.

Season 4

Before season 4, a re-branding happened and male contestants were able to participate in UNTM as well. However, this fact caused critics by fans as there was attention to the relationships between contestants, rather to the modeling.

Contestant, Olena Feofanova, said that Top Model po-ukrainsky was a mental disaster to her as she was bullied by the production, contestants and judges. https://www.youtube.com/watch?v=2bc_Mz0dIVI&t=1581s

Season 5

Before season 5, Alyona Zvirik (the creative director of the UNTM), left the UNTM team. As the result, seasons 5-7 were filmed without her participation, despite the fact that in seasons 5-6 she was mentioned as creative director of the UNTM. https://mediananny.com/intervju/2332797/

Season 5 was heavily criticised for violence and bulling. As the result, the vote "Who should participate in new season?" before season 6 was organised.

Another point of season 5 criticism was another gossip, similar to Vlada's (season 1 contestant) one. According to that gossip, Katya Polchenko, who was placed 2nd, had a lover. This time it is a famous designer, Harry Poragotsy.

Contestant Maxim Osadchuk said that he had sex with some members of UNTM stuff, so he moved to the top 6. https://www.youtube.com/watch?v=i30nQeuzULE&t=1168s

Season 6

In episode 7, there was a night fight happened, which was awful. This was heavily criticised by fans. As the result, before season 7, a rule, which prohibits violence, was included. https://www.andygoldred.com/sofi-beridze-razoblachila-shou-super-top-model-po-ukrainski/

The winner of the season, Malvina Chuklya, was supposed to get a contract with KModels, ₴100000 and excursion to the New-York. However, she did get only ₴100000 as her prise, while her flight was supposed to happen in spring 2020. She mentioned that Top Model po-ukrainsky has fooled her.

Season 7

Before season 7, a huge budget cut happened. Furthermore, this was the only season, filmed during Covid-19. https://www.andygoldred.com/sofi-beridze-razoblachila-shou-super-top-model-po-ukrainski/

Contestants Ira Simchich, Katya Polchenko and Alisa Golovnyova were supposed to participate in this season. However, they were declined. For example, Ira Simchich was replaced by Ira Moysak the day before the beginning of the filming. https://www.youtube.com/watch?v=bc-Z2m-oqNU

In episode 2, contestant Katya Chechelenko was disqualified from the competition due to unacceptable behavior on the photoshoot. However, this disqualification was heavily criticised by fandom as photographer harassed to her and there is no Katya's fault. https://www.youtube.com/watch?v=W8MsCuDtSeg https://www.andygoldred.com/sofi-beridze-razoblachila-shou-super-top-model-po-ukrainski/

In episode 7, Daria Maystrenko returned to the competition. However, her return was leaked in the trailer of the season. Besides, her return was negatively accepted by fans as during previous four episodes she had done nothing in terms of progress. Furthermore, her return was fake as she didn't want to return to the UNTM. https://www.andygoldred.com/sofi-beridze-razoblachila-shou-super-top-model-po-ukrainski/

Contestant, Anastasia Leuhina said that UNTM ruined her and caused anorexia. https://www.andygoldred.com/sofi-beridze-razoblachila-shou-super-top-model-po-ukrainski/

Notes

References

External links 
 Official website

Ukraine
Ukrainian reality television series
Ukrainian television series based on American television series
Novyi Kanal original programming